The first USS Charleston was a row galley that served in the United States Navy from 1798 to 1802.

Charleston was built at Charleston, South Carolina, in 1798. Commanded by Captain-of-a-Galley James Payne, she was used to defend the coast of South Carolina during the Quasi-War with France. She was sold in Charleston around 1 February 1802.

References

Age of Sail naval ships of the United States
1798 ships